Pertusaria pertusa is a species of fungus belonging to the family Pertusariaceae.

It is native to Eurasia and Southern Africa.

References

pertusa